The men's 20 kilometres walk event at the 2016 African Championships in Athletics was held on 26 June in Durban.

Results

References

2016 African Championships in Athletics
Racewalking at the African Championships in Athletics